The 2010 Prefontaine Classic was the 36th edition of the annual outdoor track and field meeting in Eugene, Oregon, United States. Held on Saturday July 3, 2010 at Hayward Field, it was the sixth leg of the inaugural IAAF Diamond League – the highest level international track and field circuit. Previously the Prefontaine Classic had been a part of the now defunct IAAF World Athletics Tour, but not in the IAAF Golden League which consisted of the top-tier meets in the tour.

The meet's debut in the Diamond League resulted in 12 new meeting records being set out of 19 contested events, with yearly world leading marks being set on top of five of the meeting record performances. In the men's events the 200 meters had been most anticipated, which Walter Dix won with a meeting record in 19.72 seconds, defeating second fastest man in history Tyson Gay who had recently returned to competition from groin surgery. Ethiopian Tariku Bekele ran a 5000 m meeting record in 12:58.93, also the best time ever run on American soil. David Oliver matched the American record in the 110 m hurdles with a world leading time and meeting record in 12.90 s, just 0.03 s slower than the world record. The shot put saw Christian Cantwell win by more than a meter, with a world leading mark and meeting record of 22.41 m. In the non-scoring 1000 m, Sudanese athlete Abubaker Kaki Khamis set a world leading time, national record, and meeting record in 2:13.62.

In the women's competition, Veronica Campbell-Brown defeated reigning Olympic and world champion Shelly-Ann Fraser over 100 m in 10.78 s, a world leading personal best time and a meeting record. Mariya Savinova set a world leading time and meeting record in the 800 m with a personal best time in 1:57.56. Though she did not win the triple jump, Canadian Tabia Charles set a national record with a mark of 13.99 m.

Diamond League results
Top three placers in each scoring event earned four points, two points, and one point for first place, second place, and third place respectively.

Men

Women

Non-Diamond League results

Men

Women

References

Results
SAMSUNG DIAMOND LEAGUE 2010. Diamond League. Retrieved 2020-01-15.

External links
Official Diamond League Prefontaine Classic website

2010
Prefontaine Classic
Prefontaine Classic
Prefontaine Classic